Simon Jan van Ooststroom (2 January 1906 in Rotterdam – 28 September 1982 in Oegstgeest) was a Dutch botanist.

Life 
From 1927 to 1934 Oostroom was a research assistant of the Botanical Museum and the Herbarium in Utrecht. He was awarded his doctorate from Utrecht University in 1934. Subsequently he was first an employee and later curator of the Rijksherbarium in Leiden, now merged into the National Herbarium of the Netherlands. He retired in February 1971, 

From several field trips through Europe he collected a large variety of plants. Oostroom was the author of several publications on taxonomy, mainly on Convolvulaceae, and was from 1948 to 1975 co-editor of Flora Neerlandica. He was regional adviser for the Netherlands on the Flora Europaea project.

Works

References

Sources and links 
Ooststroom on the Website of the Nationaalherbarium

biographical note and pictures of van Ooststroom

1906 births
1982 deaths
20th-century Dutch botanists
Scientists from Rotterdam
Utrecht University alumni